BK Havlíčkův Brod (until 2015 known as HC Rebel Havlíčkův Brod) is an ice hockey team in Havlíčkův Brod, Czech Republic. Until the 2014-15 season, the club played in the Czech 1. Liga, however, the team was relegated to the Czech 2. liga at the end of the season. The club was founded in 1928.

Achievements
Czech 2.liga champion: 1993, 2006.

External links
 Official site
 Rebel Hearts, the official fanclub of the team

Ice hockey teams in the Czech Republic
Ice hockey clubs established in 1928
Sport in Havlíčkův Brod